SJM Institute of technology (SJMIT) was established in the academic year 1980–81, with blessings of  then president  of SJM Vidyapeetha Sri Mallikarjuna Murugharajendra Mahaswamiji. Located just adjacent to the National Highway-4, SJMIT has a clean green campus with all facilities spread over a vast area of 35 acres.

The college is recognized by All India Council for Technical Education (AICTE) New Delhi, approved by Govt. of Karnataka and affiliated to Visveswariah Technological University (VTU) Belgaum.  

It offers Bachelor of Engineering(B.E) in 5 Engineering Disciplines, and 
Master of Technology(M.Tech) in Computer Science and Engineering, Thermal Power Engineering and Structural Engineering.

Courses 
Undergraduate
The college offers four year Undergraduate courses in 5 Disciplines of engineering:
 Civil Engineering
 Computer Science & Engineering
 Electrical & Electronics Engineering
 Electronics & Communication Engineering
 Mechanical Engineering

Postgraduate
The Institute offers the following Post graduate course:
 Master of Technology with specializations in Computer Science & Engineering.
 Master of Technology with specializations in Thermal Power Engineering.
 Master of Technology with specializations in Structural Engineering.

Doctor of Philosophy
The Institute offers the following Research Subjects

 Electrical & Electronics Engineering

 Mechanical Engineering

 Civil Engineering

See also 
Chitradurga

References 

Engineering colleges in Karnataka
Universities and colleges in Chitradurga district
Educational institutions established in 1980
1980 establishments in Punjab, India